The 2003 British National Track Championships were a series of track cycling competitions held from 17–23 August 2003 at the Manchester Velodrome.

Medal summary

Men's Events

Women's Events

References

National Track Championships